Batt Reef is a coral reef off Port Douglas in Shire of Douglas, Queensland, Australia.

Geography 

The reef is about 18 km long by 5 km (11 miles by 3 miles) wide, lying northwest to southeast, at the northern side of the Trinity Passage that leads from the inner Reef channel from Trinity Bay to the Pacific Ocean.

History 
The area received a high level of media attention following the death of The Crocodile Hunter star Steve Irwin on 4 September 2006 from a stingray attack, while filming an underwater documentary entitled Ocean's Deadliest.

References

Islands on the Great Barrier Reef
Coastline of Queensland
Uninhabited islands of Australia
Islands of Far North Queensland